Herbert William Bainbridge (29 October 1862 – 3 March 1940) was an English first-class cricketer and footballer. Bainbridge played cricket principally for Eton, Marylebone Cricket Club (MCC), Surrey, Cambridge University and Warwickshire. He was born at Guwahati, Assam, India and died at Leamington Spa, Warwickshire, England.

Cricket career
Bainbridge played four seasons at Eton College, being made captain in 1882. While studying at Trinity College, Cambridge, he played for Cambridge University and was awarded his Blue in 1884 and appointed captain in 1885. The right-handed batsman played for Warwickshire between 1894 and 1902 and was appointed captain in his first season, after making appearances for Surrey from 1883 to 1885. His highest score of 162 was made against Hampshire with a career average of 25.76, his slow-bowling claimed 31 wickets at an average of 31.87.

England selector
Bainbridge was one of the first three England selectors on The Ashes tour of 1899 along with Lord Hawke and  W. G. Grace.

Football career
Bainbridge played football for Cambridge University without gaining his Blue. In 1883, he played football for the losing finalists Old Etonians against Blackburn Olympic in the 1883 FA Cup Final.

References

1862 births
1940 deaths
Cricketers from Guwahati
People educated at Eton College
Alumni of Trinity College, Cambridge
English cricketers
English cricketers of 1864 to 1889
English cricketers of 1890 to 1918
English footballers
Marylebone Cricket Club cricketers
Surrey cricketers
Cambridge University cricketers
Warwickshire cricketers
North v South cricketers
Gentlemen cricketers
Midland Counties cricketers
Warwickshire cricket captains
Old Etonians F.C. players
East of England cricketers
Gentlemen of England cricketers
Oxford and Cambridge Universities cricketers
Cricketers from Assam
Association football forwards
Lord Hawke's XI cricketers
C. I. Thornton's XI cricketers
Second Class Counties cricketers
E. J. Sanders' XI cricketers
FA Cup Final players